Ten Mile Run is an unincorporated community and census-designated place (CDP) located in Franklin Township, in Somerset County, New Jersey, United States. As of the 2010 United States Census, the CDP's population was 1,959.

Geography
According to the United States Census Bureau, Ten Mile Run had a total area of 2.539 square miles (6.576 km2), including 2.538 square miles (6.573 km2) of land and 0.001 square miles (0.002 km2) of water (0.04%).

The area is named for the Ten Mile Run, a stream of the same name the hill on which it sits (part of the Rocky Hill Ridge). The area is located along Route 27 (Lincoln Highway) near its intersection with County Route 518. It is located across Route 27 from South Brunswick, Middlesex County. Most of the area consists of less densely-spaced single family homes throughout and commercial establishments along Route 27. The remainder of the area is forested and hilly as the terrain descends towards the Delaware and Raritan Canal and Millstone River. Kendall Park, the CDP located on the South Brunswick side of Route 27, consists of more densely-spaced homes.

Demographics

Census 2010

References

Census-designated places in Somerset County, New Jersey
Franklin Township, Somerset County, New Jersey